Cherry Lane is an unincorporated community located in the Cherry Lane Township of Alleghany County, North Carolina, United States.  The community was settled circa 1838 and was named for the cherry tree-bordered lane that led to the home of local resident Frank Bryan .  The community is located along U.S. Highway 21, near its junction with the Blue Ridge Parkway in southeastern Alleghany County.

See also
 Cherry Lane Township

References
 

Unincorporated communities in Alleghany County, North Carolina
Unincorporated communities in North Carolina